Andreas Ulvo (born 22 July 1983 in Kongsvinger, Norway) is a Norwegian jazz pianist, organist, keyboardist and composer, known from cooperations with Shining, Ingrid Olava, Mathias Eick Quartet, Solveig Slettahjell & Slow Motion Orchestra, Karl Seglem and Thom Hell.

Career

Ulvo holds a master's degree in Jazz and Improvisation from Norwegian Academy of Music in Oslo. He has with his own projects Eple Trio, a Norwegian contemporary jazz trio playing their own original music, been on tour in Japan 2010, playing gigs in Tokyo, Chiba, Kobe, Kanazawa, Yokohama and Saitama. In addition he has "Ulvo Ensemble", and have worked with bands and artists like Shining, Mathias Eick Quartet, Solveig Slettahjell & Slow Motion Orchestra, "Frøy Aagre Offbeat", Karl Seglem and Thom Hell to mention some.

At Vossajazz 2014, he joined Gisle Torvik presenting his "fjord-jazz" together with Karl Seglem and Epletrio, including Sigurd Hole and Jonas Howden Sjøvaag.

Photography
Ulvo is also a self-taught photographer, specializing in band and artist photography. He works with different types of photographic media, such as digital, polaroid, toy cameras, medium format and large format cameras.

Discography

Solo albums
2011: Light & loneliness (AIM SoundCity)
2016: Unchangeable Seasons (Soundcanbeseen)

As leader
With Eple Trio
2007: Made This (NorCD)
2008: The widening sphere of influence (NorCD)
2009: Norsk jazz no (NorCD), with Karl Seglem
2010: In the clearing/In the cavern (NorCD)
2014: Universal Cycle (Shipwreckords)

With "Ulvo Ensemble"
2008: The Sound of rain needs no translation (AIM Records)

With "Andreas Ulvo + Slagr"
2012: Softspeaker (Atterklang)

With Ulvo / Hole / Haltli
2016: StaiStua (NorCD)

As sideman
With Frøy Aagre
2004: Katalyze (AIM Records), with "Frøy Aagre Offbeat"
2007: Countryside (AIM Records), with "Frøy Aagre Offbeat"
2010: Cycle of silence (ACT Music), with "Frøy Aagre Offbeat"
2013: Frøy Aagre Electric (Momentum Records), with "Frøy Aagre Electric" including Jonas Barsten

With Solveig Slettahjell & Slow Motion Orchestra
2009: Tarpan Seasons (Universal Music)

With Seglem/Kallerdahl/Ulvo/Hole/Sjøvaag
2009: Skoddeheimen (NorCD)
2015: Live In Germany (NorCD)

With "T8"
2010: Big shit (Schmell Records)

With Mathias Eick
2011: Skala (ECM Records)
2013: I Concentrate on You (Grappa Music), feat. Elvira Nikolaisen
2018: Ravensburg (ECM Records)

With Ellen Andrea Wang
2014: Diving (Propeller)

With Lena Nymark
2014: Beautiful Silence'' (Grappa Music)

References

External links

20th-century Norwegian organists
21st-century Norwegian organists
20th-century Norwegian pianists
21st-century Norwegian pianists
Norwegian jazz composers
Norwegian keyboardists
Male organists
Norwegian jazz pianists
ECM Records artists
Musicians from Eidskog
Musicians from Kongsvinger
1983 births
Living people
Norwegian male pianists
Male jazz composers
20th-century Norwegian male musicians
21st-century Norwegian male musicians
Shining (Norwegian band) members
Eple Trio members
NorCD artists